Hendriksen and Hendrikse are Dutch patronymic surnames ("son of Hendrik"). People with the name include:

Hendriksen
Arne Hendriksen (1911-1996), Norwegian-Swedish ceramic artist and opera singer
Roy Hendriksen (born 1969), Dutch football player and manager
 (1907–2001), Dutch auxiliary bishop
Ulrik Hendriksen (1891–1960), Danish-Norwegian painter and graphic artis
William Hendriksen (1900-1982), American New Testament scholar
Hendrikse
Klaas Hendrikse (born 1947), Dutch atheist pastor
Maryke Hendrikse (born 1979), Bahamian-Canadian voice actress

See also
Hendriks
Hendriksen Strait in Canada

References

Dutch-language surnames
Patronymic surnames
Surnames from given names